Anusha is a name of multiple origins meaning "dawn" or "auspicious morning" in Sanskrit, and "immortal" or "ambrosial" in Persian (انوشه). Anusha may also be etymologically traced to the Tamil astronomical term anusham. Notable people with the name include:

 Anusha (actress) (born 1978), South Indian actress
 Anusha Dandekar (born 1981), Sudan-born Australian-Indian actress and VJ
 Anusha Mani, Indian female playback singer
 Anusha Rizvi (born 1978), Indian film director and screenwriter
 Neeragattu Anusha (born 1999), Andhraite cricketer

References 

Tamil names